Nibu may refer to:

People
 Akari Nibu (born 2001), Japanese celebrity

Places
 Mount Nebo or Nibu, Jordan
 Nibu Station, Japan

Other
 Niboo or Nibu, Maldivian film